Cycloisomaltooligosaccharide glucanotransferase is an enzyme with systematic name (1->6)-alpha-D-glucan:(1->6)-alpha-D-glucan 6-alpha-D-(1->6alpha-D-glucano)-transferase (cyclizing). This enzyme catalyses the following chemical reaction

 cyclizes part of a (1->6)-alpha-D-glucan chain by formation of a (1->6)-alpha-D-glucosidic bond

This enzyme is specific for (1->6)-alpha-D-glucans (dextrans).

References

External links 
 

EC 2.4.1